Newman is a surname.

Newman may also refer to:

Places

United States
 Newman, California
 Newman, Illinois
 Newman, Kansas
 Newman, Kentucky
 Newman, New Mexico
 Newman, Ohio
 Newman, Texas
 Newman Creek, a stream in Ohio
 Newman Grove, Nebraska
 Newman Township (disambiguation)

Other places
 Newman, Western Australia, Australia
 Newman Bay, a fjord in Greenland

Arts and entertainment
 Newman (Seinfeld), a character on the U.S. program Seinfeld
 "Newman", a 2019 song by BloodPop

Other uses
 Newman Club (rugby), an Argentine sports club
 Newman College (disambiguation) 
 Newman University (disambiguation)
 Newman's, an American department store chain
 Newman's Own, an American food company
 Newmans Coach Lines, a New Zealand transport company
 Justice Newman (disambiguation)
 USS Newman (DE-205)
 USS Newman K. Perry (DD-883)

See also 
 
 New man (disambiguation)
 Numan (race), fictional characters, in the Phantasy Star series of video games